Luis Fernando Espinel Lalama (born 30 June 1967) is an Ecuadorian football manager and former player.

Coaching career
Born in Quito, Espinel was Sixto Vizuete's assistant at the Ecuador national team, the Ecuador under-20 national team and El Nacional before being named manager of Imbabura in the Serie B in October 2012. He left the post nearly one month later, however.

Espinel was in charge of LDU Portoviejo during the 2013 campaign, and was appointed manager of Macará in January 2014. He left the club in April, and returned to Imbabura in November for the last three rounds of the season; he narrowly avoided relegation with the club, and left in December 2015 after a comfortable mid-table finish.

Named at the helm of Manta for the 2016 campaign, Espinel left the club in August. He was presented as manager of Mushuc Runa in January 2017, but left in June to return to Imbabura for a third spell.

On 26 March 2018, Espinel was appointed Clan Juvenil manager. He left the club just before the end of the season, and was named in charge of Serie A side América de Quito in May 2019; he resigned from the latter club in September.

In 2020, Espinel took over Segunda Categoría side Cumbayá and led them to the second division. He was named at the helm of Deportivo Quito also in the second level in March 2021, but left the club to take the reins Olmedo in the top tier on 5 August.

References

External links

1967 births
Living people
People from Quito
Ecuadorian footballers
L.D.U. Quito footballers
C.D. Universidad Católica del Ecuador footballers
Ecuadorian football managers
LDU Portoviejo managers
C.S.D. Macará managers
S.D. Quito managers
C.D. Olmedo managers
Association footballers not categorized by position
Cumbayá F.C. managers
Mushuc Runa S.C. managers